Laurent Depouilly (born 26 October 1963 in Asnières-sur-Seine) is a French figure skater. He is the 1986 French national champion. He represented France at the 1984 Winter Olympics, where he placed 15th. He is married to Nathalie Depouilly and their daughter Chloe Depouilly is a competitive skater.

Following his retirement from competitive skating, he became a coach at Club Olympique de Courbevoie in Courbevoie, France. Among his current and former students are Brian Joubert, Vinciane Fortin, Adam Siao Him Fa, Camille Kovalev / Pavel Kovalev, Océane Piegad / Denys Strekalin, Ivan Shmuratko, and his daughter Chloe.

Competitive highlights

References

 
 
 

1963 births
Living people
People from Asnières-sur-Seine
French male single skaters
Olympic figure skaters of France
Figure skaters at the 1984 Winter Olympics
French figure skating coaches
Sportspeople from Hauts-de-Seine